James McGivern (born 6 January 1998) is a boxer from Belfast Northern Ireland. He trains at St. George's ABC, Belfast.

In 2015, he won gold at bantamweight at the Commonwealth Youth Games. A few months later, competing above his natural class, McGivern claimed silver at the European Youth Championships. Both medals came when McGivern was in his first year at Youth level.

In 2016, he was controversially beaten in the opening round of the European Youths. At lightweight, he won bronze at the 2018 Commonwealth Games.

References

External links

Living people
1998 births
Male boxers from Northern Ireland
Commonwealth Games medallists in boxing
Commonwealth Games bronze medallists for Northern Ireland
Boxers at the 2018 Commonwealth Games
Boxers from Belfast
European Games competitors for Ireland
Boxers at the 2019 European Games
Lightweight boxers
Medallists at the 2018 Commonwealth Games